Christopher Gaffney, a prebendary of St Patrick's Cathedral, Dublin, was Bishop of Ossory  from 1566 until his death on 3 August 1576.

Notes

1576 deaths
16th-century Anglican bishops in Ireland
Anglican bishops of Ossory